Kotak may refer to:
Kotak (band), an Indonesian rock band
Kotak (surname), surname and people who bear it
Kotak Mahindra Bank, an Indian financial service firm
Kotak Securities, subsidiary of Kotak Mahindra Bank
Kotak, Iran (disambiguation)
Qal'eh-ye Kotak (Kotak Castle), a village in Iran
Kotak Bozorg (Greater Kotak), a village in Iran

See also
Katak, Iran (disambiguation)